Brett Lancaster  (born 15 November 1979) is an Australian former professional racing cyclist, who rode professionally between 2003 and 2016. Born in Shepparton, Victoria, Lancaster started cycle racing at the age of 14 in 1993.

His greatest successes as a road cyclist were winning the prologue of the Giro d'Italia, and thus wearing the race general classification leader's pink jersey. He set a time of 1' 20" for the  race against the clock, the shortest prologue in the 88-year history of the event. Brett Lancaster is the first member of the Italian registered team, to ever claim the pink jersey.

He won a gold medal at the 2004 Summer Olympics in Athens as a member of the team pursuit (with Graeme Brown, Bradley McGee, and Luke Roberts) in world record-breaking time of 3:58.233.

He was awarded the Order of Australia Medal (OAM) in the 2005 Australia Day Honours List. He was an Australian Institute of Sport scholarship holder.

Major results

Road

1996
 1st  Junior race, National Criterium Championships
1997
 National Junior Road Championships
1st  Time trial
2nd Criterium
2001
 1st Stage 9 Herald Sun Tour
2002
 1st Ronde van Overijssel
 4th Mi-Août 4
2003
 6th Overall International Tour of Rhodes
2004
 1st Stage 3 Tour de Langkawi
2005
 1st Prologue Giro d'Italia
 2nd Paris–Camembert
 3rd Gran Premio Città di Misano – Adriatico
 8th Overall Circuit de Lorraine
2006
 4th Grand Prix de Rennes
2007
 3rd Eindhoven Team Time Trial
 6th Down Under Classic
2008
 1st Prologue Deutschland Tour
 9th Firenze–Pistoia
2009
 2nd Overall Tour du Poitou-Charentes
2010
 1st Stage 2 Tour of California
2013
 1st Stage 4 (TTT) Tour de France
 Tour of Slovenia
1st  Points classification
1st Stage 4
 2nd  Team time trial, UCI Road World Championships
2014
 1st Stage 1 (TTT) Giro d'Italia
 2nd  Team time trial, UCI Road World Championships
 8th Vuelta a La Rioja
2015
 1st Stage 1 (TTT) Giro d'Italia

Track

1997
 1st  Team pursuit, UCI Junior Track Cycling World Championships
 National Junior Track Championships
1st  Individual pursuit
1st  Track time trial
2nd Team pursuit
2nd Team sprint
1998
 1st  Team pursuit, Commonwealth Games
 UCI Track World Cup Classics, Victoria
1st  Team pursuit
3rd  Individual pursuit
1999
 Team pursuit, UCI Track World Cup Classics
1st  Frisco
1st  Cali
 2nd Individual pursuit, National Track Championships
2000
 National Track Championships
2nd Individual pursuit
2nd Team pursuit
2001
 2nd Team pursuit, National Track Championships
2002
 1st  Team pursuit, UCI Track World Championships
2003
 1st  Team pursuit, UCI Track World Championships
 2nd Madison, National Track Championships
2004
 1st  Team pursuit, Olympic Games

References

External links

1979 births
Living people
Australian male cyclists
Cyclists at the 2000 Summer Olympics
Cyclists at the 2004 Summer Olympics
Cyclists at the 2008 Summer Olympics
Australian Giro d'Italia stage winners
Olympic cyclists of Australia
Olympic gold medalists for Australia
Cyclists at the 1998 Commonwealth Games
Recipients of the Medal of the Order of Australia
People from Shepparton
Cyclists from Victoria (Australia)
Australian Institute of Sport cyclists
Olympic medalists in cycling
Medalists at the 2004 Summer Olympics
UCI Track Cycling World Champions (men)
Commonwealth Games medallists in cycling
Commonwealth Games gold medallists for Australia
Australian track cyclists
Medallists at the 1998 Commonwealth Games